Delicious (1931) is an American pre-Code Gershwin musical romantic comedy film starring Janet Gaynor and Charles Farrell, directed by David Butler, with color sequences in Multicolor (now lost).

Production background

The film features music by George Gershwin, including the introduction of Rhapsody in Rivets, which was expanded by the composer even before the film soundtrack was recorded into the concert work for piano and orchestra Second Rhapsody, regarded today as one of Gershwin's neglected masterpieces. Gershwin also contributed other sequences for the score, but only a five-minute dream sequence called The Melting Pot and the six-minute Rhapsody in Rivets made the final cut. Fox Film Corporation rejected the rest of the score.

Gaynor plays a Scottish girl emigrating by ship to America who runs afoul of the authorities and has to go on the run, falling in with a ragtag group of immigrant musicians in Manhattan. Gaynor and Farrell made almost a dozen films together, including Frank Borzage's classics Seventh Heaven (1927), Street Angel (1928), and Lucky Star (1929). Gaynor won the first Academy Award for Best Actress for the first two and F. W. Murnau's Sunrise: A Song of Two Humans.

Cast
Janet Gaynor as Heather Gordon
Charles Farrell as Larry Beaumont
El Brendel as Chris Jansen
Raul Roulien as Sascha
Lawrence O'Sullivan as Detective O'Flynn
Manya Roberti as Olga
Olive Tell as Mrs. Van Bergh
Virginia Cherrill as Diana Van Bergh
Mischa Auer as Mischa
Marvine Maazel as Toscha

Preservation status
On December 14, 2011, Turner Classic Movies aired a print of the film restored by George Eastman House.

On September 22, 2013, it was announced that a musicological critical edition of the full orchestral score will be eventually released. The Gershwin family, working in conjunction with the Library of Congress and the University of Michigan, are working to make scores available to the public that represent Gershwin's true intent. The entire Gershwin project may take 30 to 40 years to complete, and it is unclear when the score to Delicious will be released. It will be the first time this score has ever been published.

See also
List of early color feature films

References

External links
 
 
 Delicious at TCM Movie Database
 

1931 films
1931 musical comedy films
1931 romantic comedy films
1930s color films
American musical comedy films
American romantic comedy films
American romantic musical films
American black-and-white films
1930s English-language films
Films about immigration to the United States
Films directed by David Butler
Films set in New York City
Fox Film films
George Gershwin in film
Films with screenplays by Sonya Levien
1930s American films
Silent romantic comedy films